Dischidia formosana is a species of plant in the genus Dischidia native to Taiwan and the Ryukyu Islands. Like other Dischidia it has a climbing growth habit, producing smooth, round leaves and tiny white flowers. Though not particularly rare in Taiwan, the species is on the Japanese Red List as a critically endangered plant.

References

formosana
Plants described in 1877